Kalatu (also Romanized as Kalātū) is a village in Tazian Rural District, in the Central District of Bandar Abbas County, Hormozgan Province, Iran. At the 2006 census, its population was 205, in 40 families.

References 

Populated places in Bandar Abbas County